Samuel Goode (March 21, 1756November 14, 1822) was a United States representative from Virginia. Born in "Whitby" in Chesterfield County in the Colony of Virginia, he completed preparatory studies, studied law, was admitted to the bar and practiced. During the American Revolutionary War he served as a lieutenant in the Chesterfield Troop of Horse and later as a colonel of militia. He was a member of the Virginia House of Delegates from 1778 to 1785, and was elected as a Democratic-Republican to the Sixth Congress, serving from March 4, 1799 to March 3, 1801. After leaving Congress, Goode returned to law, along with managing his land.

His son was Dr. Thomas Goode, who was later the owner and operator of the Homestead spa.

He died in Invermay, Mecklenburg County; interment was on his estate near Invermay.

References

1756 births
1822 deaths
People from Chesterfield County, Virginia
Members of the Virginia House of Delegates
Virginia militiamen in the American Revolution
Virginia lawyers
Democratic-Republican Party members of the United States House of Representatives from Virginia
Virginia colonial people
People from Mecklenburg County, Virginia
19th-century American lawyers